Helga Do Rosario Gomes is a biological oceanographer at the Goes-Gomes Lab at Columbia University's Lamont Doherty Earth Observatory, New York, USA.

Gomes' research focuses on human activities in coastal megacities, the changing biodiversity of the Arabian Sea, and the repercussions for the food chain.

Gomes, from the region of Goa along the Indian west coast, was earlier part of the National Institute of Oceanography at Dona Paula.

References

Goans in science and technology
Indian oceanographers
Living people
Year of birth missing (living people)